Guo Qiru (1900 – 1969) was a Chinese xiangsheng performer.

Biography
On 12 April 1900, Guo was born in Beijing, to a poor family. He belonged to the Manchu ethnic group. He was educated in an old-style private school for about 6 years. In 1923, Guo joined Hongkuishe. He started to learn the arts of traditional Chinese opera. In 1925, he studied under Liu Dezhi and became a fifth-generation xiangsheng performer. In 1940, he performed xiangsheng with Hou Baolin and became widely known. In 1951, Guo and Hou Baolin gave a gratitude performance at the front of the Korean War. In 1954, Guo and Hou Baolin gave a gratitude performance in Tibet.

References

1900 births
1969 deaths
Male actors from Beijing
Chinese xiangsheng performers
Chinese male stage actors
20th-century Chinese male actors
20th-century comedians